Vatica pauciflora is a species of tree in the family Dipterocarpaceae. The specific epithet  is Latin for 'few-flowered'.

Distribution
Vatica pauciflora is native to Sumatra (including Bangka Island), Peninsular Malaysia, Singapore and Thailand. It is common in freshwater swamps and on riparian river banks.

Threats
Vatica pauciflora is threatened by residential development and agricultural plantations. Also, the species is being logged for its timber.

References

pauciflora
Trees of Sumatra
Trees of Malaya
Trees of Thailand